Habeck is a surname. Notable people with the surname include:

Janine Habeck (born 1983), German model
Mary R. Habeck, American academic
Michael Habeck (1944–2011), German actor
Robert Habeck (born 1969), German writer and politician